Kill the Child is the sixth live album by the New York City band Swans, released in 1996. It was recorded from shows in 1985, 1986 and 1987 in Germany, Yugoslavia, the United Kingdom, and (unlisted) the United States. The album was mastered as a single track in an attempt to recreate the concert experience, and focuses primarily on Gira-sung material from Children of God.

Track listing

References

External links
Swans official website - Kill the Child

1995 live albums
Swans (band) live albums
Albums produced by Michael Gira